Agnès Laurent (28 January 1936 – 16 February 2010) was a French actress.  She mainly acted in France, but is perhaps known in the United Kingdom for playing the title role in the British comedy film A French Mistress.

Selected filmography
 Women's Club (1956)
 Mannequins of Paris (1956)
 Les collégiennes (1957)
 Amour de poche (1957)
 Mademoiselle Strip-tease (Striptease de Paris) (1957)
 The Green Devils of Monte Cassino (1958)
 Nina (1959)
 A French Mistress (1960)
 The Big Show (1960)
 Mary Had a Little... (1961)
 Famous Love Affairs (1961)

References

External links

 

1936 births
2010 deaths
French film actresses
Actresses from Lyon
20th-century French actresses